"Before You Walk Out of My Life" is a song by American R&B singer Monica. It was written by Andrea Martin, Carsten Schack, and Kenneth Karlin, with production helmed by Schack and Karlin under their production moniker Soulshock & Karlin. Initially helmed for fellow R&B singer Toni Braxton's Secrets (1996) album, it was left unused and later re-recorded by Monica for her debut album Miss Thang (1995). Built around drum machine-backed rhythms and a saxophone-laced beat, the mid-tempo R&B ballad was released as the album's second single on August 3, 1995, with "Like This and Like That" serving as its other half on a double A-side stateside.

In the United States, "Before You Walk Out of My Life" became Monica's second number-one hit on the Billboard Hot R&B Singles chart, spending two weeks at number-one. It also reached the top ten on the US Billboard Hot 100, the New Zealand Singles Chart, and the UK R&B chart. Additionally, the song was ranked number thirty-eight on the 1996 Billboard year-end chart and certified platinum by the RIAA. "Before You Walk Out of My Life," alongside previous single "Don't Take It Personal (Just One of Dem Days)," made the singer the youngest recording artist to have two consecutive number-one hits on Billboard's R&B chart at the age of fourteen.

Background and recording
Written by singer Andrea Martin along with Carsten Schack and Kenneth Karlin from Danish production team Soulshock & Karlin, the song was originally crafted for Toni Braxton's second studio album Secrets (1996), but later offered to Monica when it was left unused. Recorded by Jay Lean, Brian Smith, and Carsten Schack at the Pure Studio and the D.A.R.P. Studios in Atlanta, Georgia, "Before You Walk Out of My Life" was mixed by Jon Gass at The Enterprise Studios. Dallas Austin served as executive producer on the track.

Critical reception
Music Week rated the song four out of five, adding, "This 15 year old from the Whitney and Brandy school of crooning turns in an ultra-smooth, ultra appealing R&B ballad which has been top three in the US." Tony Farside from the magazine's RM Dance Update gave it five out of five, calling it "one of the best new r&b tracks around for a while." He described the song as "a mid to low tempo smoocher with an acappella-ish intro and a lazy beat", and concluded, "A grower and definitely another hit waiting to happen for Monica." Another editor, James Hamilton deemed it a "sultry" and "attractive" R&B ballad.

Music video
An accompanying music video for the single was directed by Kevin Bray and released in August 1995.  The video was edited by Scott C. Wilson.

Track listing
UK CD Single

US CD Single

Notes
 denotes additional producer

Credits and personnel
Credits adapted from the liner notes of Miss Thang.

Monica Arnold – vocals
Dallas Austin – executive producer
Jon Gass – mixing engineer
Jay Lean – recording engineer

Andrea Martin – background vocals, writer
Kenneth Karlin – producer, writer
Carsten Schack – producer, recording engineer, writer
Brian Smith – recording engineer

Charts

Weekly charts

Year-end charts

Certifications

See also
R&B number-one hits of 1996 (USA)

References

Songs about parting

1995 singles
Arista Records singles
Monica (singer) songs
Music videos directed by Kevin Bray (director)
Pop ballads
Song recordings produced by Soulshock and Karlin
Songs written by Soulshock
Songs written by Andrea Martin (musician)
Songs written by Kenneth Karlin
Songs about heartache
1995 songs
Rowdy Records singles
Contemporary R&B ballads
1990s ballads